Roderick Pitt Meagher  (17 March 1932 – 3 July 2011) was an Australian jurist and judge.

Early years and education
Meagher was a cousin of the writer Patrick White. His family owned a chain of country stores. In 1949, Meagher was Dux of St Ignatius' College, Riverview.

In 1956, Meagher graduated from the University of Sydney with degrees in Arts and Law. He was awarded university medals in History and Law. He attended St John's College and was House President there and, later, a member of its governing Council for many years. As a student he also served on the executive of the Sydney University Newman Society.

In 1962, Meager married the Australian painter Elma Penelope Moss. His third cousin is the current New South Wales Court of Appeal judge, Anthony John Meagher.

Legal career
Meagher was called to the NSW Bar in 1960. He lectured at the Faculty of Law at Sydney University within the same year. After taking Silk, Justice Meagher served as President of the New South Wales Bar Association from 1979 to 1981.

Meagher was a  Justice of the NSW Supreme Court and the Court of Appeal of New South Wales from 1989 to 15 March 2004.

He served as a patron to the Macquarie University's Macquarie Journal of Business Law.

He died on 3 July 2011 at the age of 79.

Publications
With William Gummow he co-edited five editions of Jacobs on Trusts and again with Gummow and Lehane he co-authored Equity: Doctrines and Remedies, the preeminent work on equity in Australia. Meagher has also made various contributions to Quadrant. He was described by NSW Chief Justice James Spigelman as "one of the intellectual giants of our legal history".

He was author of "Portraits on Yellow Paper", published by Central Queensland University Press in 2004.

Honours
In 2000 the Senate of the University of Sydney conferred on Meagher—"scholar, lawyer, judge and individualist", as the  citation to the Senate called him—the honorary degree of Doctor of Laws (LLD). The Senate was invited to confer the degree on Meagher for his intellectual contributions to the law in particular, referring to the classic text Equity: Doctrines & Remedies, of which Meagher was and remains co-author, as having  helped reverse the general decline of equity jurisprudence: "[t]hat book has probably enjoyed greater esteem than any other Australian legal treatise, not only in universities but also with the Bench and Bar in this country, England and elsewhere. There is no equivalent to it in England, the United States or anywhere else".
The citation also commended Meagher's service to the University of Sydney Faculty of Law, in his capacity since 1960 as lecturer in Roman law and then Challis Lecturer in Equity, commenting that "[h]is lectures were a constant source of inspiration, delight and guidance for generations of law students".

In 2003 Meagher was awarded the St John's College Medal, by the Rector and Fellows, for his outstanding service to the college and to the people of New South Wales. The awarding of this medal is extremely rare.

In 2005 Meagher was admitted as an Officer of the Order of Australia "for service to the judiciary, particularly judicial administration, to reform of the building and construction industry, and to the community through the Australian Naval Reserve and conservation and arts organisations .

Individual cases and incidents
 When John Laws was fined $50,000 for using "gross and coarse" terms on 2UE, Justice Meagher dissented and called for a jail term, stating that $50,000 was the sort of money Laws would spend "on a small cocktail party."
 Justice Mary Gaudron, in a speech to the Women Lawyers Association of NSW, brought Meagher into controversy by deeming his comment that "The bar desperately needs more women barristers [because] there are so many bad ones that people may say that women ... are hopeless by nature" as evidence of a brooding "wilfully unreconstructed" view of women in law.
 He notably opposed the move of Sydney University School of Law from the St James campus on Phillip Street in the CBD to the Camperdown campus, saying, "As long as it was in the city, the school had lots of barristers and solicitors prepared to lecture there, but those people will not be prepared to struggle up to the University. There has never been a close inter-relationship between the professions and the academics in law ... There's a certain amount of co-operation at the moment but even that amount is going to vanish".

Criticism
Patrick Atiyah has criticised Meagher's conservative view of legal doctrine in the Law Quarterly Review.

Sources
  The Samuel Griffith Society: Volume 3: Appendix III
 Damian Freeman, Roddy’s Folly: R.P. Meagher QC – art lover and lawyer (Connor Court, 2012).

References

External links
 Book review of Portraits on Yellow Paper

1932 births
2011 deaths
Judges of the Supreme Court of New South Wales
Australian King's Counsel
People educated at Saint Ignatius' College, Riverview
Officers of the Order of Australia